Sergey Fomin (born 1 February 2001) is an Uzbekistani tennis player.

Fomin has a career high ATP singles ranking of No. 348 achieved on 25 July 2022. He also has a career high ATP doubles ranking of No. 380 achieved on 25 January 2021.

Fomin represents Uzbekistan at the Davis Cup, making his first appearance in a tie against Turkey.

References

External links

2001 births
Living people
Uzbekistani male tennis players
Sportspeople from Tashkent
21st-century Uzbekistani people